The following is a list of notable deaths in June 1999.

Entries for each day are listed alphabetically by surname. A typical entry lists information in the following sequence:
 Name, age, country of citizenship at birth, subsequent country of citizenship (if applicable), reason for notability, cause of death (if known), and reference.

June 1999

1
Lloyd L. Burke, 74, United States Army soldier and recipient of the Medal of Honor.
Christopher Cockerell, 88, English engineer and inventor of the hovercraft.
Olivier Debré, 79, French abstract painter.
Mr. Prospector, 29, American thoroughbred racehorse, complications from colic.
Gert Ledig, 77, German writer.
Cris Miró, 33, Argentine entertainer and media personality, lymphoma.
Bjørn Spiro, 90, Danish film actor.

2
Abdulaziz Al-Saqqaf, 47, Yemeni human rights activist and journalist, (orchestrated) car accident.
Václav Benda, 52, Czech Roman Catholic activist and mathematician.
Junior Braithwaite, 50, Jamaican reggae musician, homicide.
Keith Gledhill, 88, American tennis player.
Yevhen Ivchenko, 60, Soviet athlete and Olympic medalist.
Blagoje Jovovic, Montenegrin Serb World War II Partisan and Chetnik.
Ron Reynolds, 71, English football goalkeeper.
Andy Simpkins, 67, American jazz bassist, stomach cancer.
Robert Sobel, 68, American writer and academic.

3
Italo Allodi, 71, Italian football player and manager.
Helge Bronée, 77, Danish footballer.
Peter Brough, 83, English radio ventriloquist.
Bernardin Mungul Diaka, 65, Congolese/Zairean diplomat and politician.
Romolo Marcellini, 88, Italian film director and screenwriter.
Myron Weiner, 68, American political scientist and scholar.

4
Ann Brown, 56, British psychologist.
Zachary Fisher, 88, American philanthropist and businessman.
G. S. Maddala, 66, Indian American economist and mathematician.
John McKeithen, 81, American lawyer, politician and governor of Louisiana.
Mike Mikulak, 86, American gridiron football player.
Yury Vasilyev, 59, Soviet and Russian stage and film actor.

5
Magne Kleiven, 77, Norwegian gymnast and Olympian.
Robert Merritt, Nova Scotia playwright and film critic.
Mel Tormé, 73, American singer and musician, stroke.
Ernie Wilkins, 79, American jazz saxophonist, conductor and arranger, stroke.

6
Anne Haddy, 68, Australian actress, renal failure.
Ilya Musin, 95, Soviet conductor and a theorist of conducting.
Manuel Ramos, 56, Mexican boxer, heart attack. 
Eddie Stanky, 83, American baseball player and manager, heart attack.

7
Bob Garber, 70, American baseball player.
Lady June, 68, English painter, poet and musician, heart attack.
Paul Oskar Kristeller, 92, German-American scholar of renaissance humanism.
Victor Otiev, 64, Soviet / Russian painter and graphic artist.
Charles D. Palmer, 97, United States Army general, cardiac arrest.
Paco Stanley, 56, Mexican television entertainer, shot.
Joseph Vandernoot, 84, British conductor.

8
Piet Blom, 65, Dutch architect.
Ted James, 92, American football player and coach.
Zofia Kuratowska, 67, Polish physician and politician.
Corrado Mantoni, 74, Italian actor and radio and television host, lung cancer.
Rosy McHargue, 97, American jazz clarinetist.
Karl Z. Morgan, 91, American physicist and radiation health physics pioneer.
Francis Shorland, 89, New Zealand organic chemist.
Emiliano Tardif, 71, Canadian missionary, heart complications.
Gordon Towers, 79, Canadian politician and lieutenant governor of Alberta.
Fred Wampler, 89, American politician.

9
Al Bates, 94, American Olympic athlete.
Ernesto Calindri, 90, Italian theater and film actor, stroke.
Heimo Haitto, 74, Finnish-American classical violinist.
Maurice Journeau, 100, French composer.
Giles Sutherland Rich, 95, American judge and influential patent attorney, lymphoma.
Andrew L. Stone, 96, American screenwriter, film director and producer.
Ray Yagiello, 75, American football coach.

10
Manlio Busoni, 92, Italian film and television actor.
Kenneth S. Davis, 86, American historian.
Béla Egresi, 77, Hungarian football player.
Henry Grunfeld, 95, German-British merchant banker.
Grete Natzler, 92, Austrian actress and operatic soprano.
Jerry Elizalde Navarro, 75, Philippine artist.
Leonard Thornton, 82, New Zealand Army officer.
Oswald Tippo, 87, American botanist and educator.
Jiří Vršťala, 78, Czech film actor.
J. E. Caerwyn Williams, 87, Welsh scholar.
Chen Xilian, 84, Chinese Army general and politician.

11
Gilles Châtelet, 55, French philosopher and mathematician, suicide.
DeForest Kelley, 79, American actor (Star Trek, Gunfight at the O.K. Corral, Apache Uprising), stomach cancer.
Viljo Nousiainen, 55, Finnish high jumping coach.
Gordon Stirling, 74, Australian politician.

12
Ola Bauer, 55, Norwegian novelist and playwright, cancer.
Jean Capdouze, 56, French rugby player.
Sergey Khlebnikov, 43, Russian Olympic speed skater, drowned.
Jah Lloyd, 51, Jamaican reggae singer, deejay and record producer, asthma.
J. F. Powers, 81, American novelist and short-story writer.
Jalagam Vengala Rao, 78, Indian politician.
Bib Stillwell, 71, Australian racing driver.
Gerd Tellenbach, 95, German historian and scholar.
Aleksandras Štromas, 68, Lithuanian political scientist, dissident and author.

13
Gabriel Grüner, 35, Italian photojournalist, shot by Yugoslavian soldiers.
Volker Krämer, 56, German journalist, shot by Yugoslavian soldiers.
Carlos Kroeber, 64, Brazilian actor.
Igor Ksenofontov, 60, Soviet and Russian figure skating coach, heart failure.
Jørgen Olesen, 75, Danish footballer player.
Kjell Rosén, 78, Swedish footballer player.
Douglas Seale, 85, English actor (Aladdin, Ernest Saves Christmas, Amadeus).
Diablo Velasco, 80, Mexican professional wrestler

14
Henri Baruk, 101, French neuropsychiatrist.
Kurt Blaukopf, 85, Austrian music sociologist.
Jack M. Campbell, 82, American politician.
Louis Diamond, 97, American pediatrician, known as the "father of pediatric hematology".
Osvaldo Dragún, 70, Argentine playwright.
Bernie Faloney, 66, Canadian football player, colorectal cancer.
Anna McCune Harper, 96, American tennis player.
Henry "Junjo" Lawes, 51, Jamaican record producer, drive-by shooting.
Cecil Morgan, 100, American politician.
Hann Trier, 83, German artist.

15
Alan Cathcart, 6th Earl Cathcart, 79, British Army officer.
Sigrid Hunke, 86, German SS-member during World War II, author, and neopagan.
Igor Kholin, 79, Russian poet and fiction writer, liver cancer.
Sherman A. Minton, 80, American physician, herpetologist and toxinologist.
Fausto Papetti, 76, Italian alto saxophone player.
Fred Tiedt, 63, Irish boxer and Olympic silver medalist.

16
Lennart Geijer, 89, Swedish politician and lawyer.
James Ottaway, 90, British film, television and stage actor.
Lawrence Stone, 79, English historian of early modern Britain, Parkinson's disease.
Screaming Lord Sutch, 58, English musician and serial parliamentary candidate, suicide by hanging.
Marshall Wayne, 87, American diver and Olympic champion (1936).

17
Albert Bailey, 84, Australian politician.
Rajendra Kumari Bajpai, 74, Indian politician.
Stanley Faulder, 61, Canadian convict, execution by lethal injection.
Basil Hume, 76, English Roman Catholic bishop, cancer.
A. W. Kuchler, 91, German-American geographer and naturalist.
Paul-Émile de Souza, 68, Beninese army officer and political figure.
Lynn E. Stalbaum, 79, American politician.

18
Loyd Arms, 79, American football player.
Ross Baillie, 21, Scottish track and field athlete, complications from anaphylaxis.
Dircinha Batista, 77, Brazilian actress and singer.
Bob Bullock, 69, American politician from Texas, cancer.
Robert G. Neumann, 83, American politician and diplomat.
Lothar Ulsaß, 58, German football player, stroke.
ʻAlī Ṭanṭāwī, 90, Syrian Salafi jurist, writer, and broadcaster.

19
Henri d’Orléans, 90, French nobleman, Orleanist pretender to the throne, prostate cancer.
Saeed Emami, 41, Iranian deputy minister of intelligence, suicide.
Oton Gliha, 85, Croatian artist.
Heloísa Helena, 81, Brazilian actress and singer.
Leslie Holdridge, 91, American botanist and climatologist.
Kamal el-Din Hussein, 78, Egyptian military officer and politician, liver cancer.
Arvid Pardo, 85, Maltese-Swedish diplomat and academic.
Ronald Robinson, 78, British  historian.
Mario Soldati, 92, Italian writer and film director.
Leonard P. Stavisky, 73, American politican and academic, complications from a cerebral hemorrhage.
Cesáreo Victorino, 52, Mexican football player, traffic accident.

20
Gautam Chattopadhyay, 51, Indian Bengali singer, songwriter and composer.
Clifton Fadiman, 95, American author, and radio and television personality, pancreatic cancer.
T. A. Goudge, 89, Canadian philosopher and university professor.
Barbara Jeppe, 78, South African botanical artist, pneumonia.
Iulian Mihu, 72, Romanian film director.

21
Chandrakala, Indian film actress, cancer.
Edwin Hewitt, 79, American mathematician.
Tuure Junnila, 88, Finnish economist and politician.
Kami, 26, Japanese rock musician, drummer (Malice Mizer), cerebral haemorrhage.
Karl Krolow, 84, German poet and translator.
Ted Wolf, 76, American writer.

22
Wassila Ben Ammar, 87, First Lady of Tunisia (1962 - 1986).
Mark Anthony Bracegirdle, 86, British-Australian marxist revolutionary.
Michael Bredl, 83, German Volksmusik musician, -collector, and -publisher.
Luboš Fišer, 63, Czech composer.
Eugenio Florit, 95, Cuban writer, essayist, radio actor and diplomat.
Guy Tunmer, 50, South African racing driver, motorcycle accident.

23
Francisco Rovira Beleta, 85/86, Spanish screenwriter and film director.
Bert Haas, 85, American baseball player.
Aziz Ishak, 85, Malaysian freedom fighter, politician and journalist.
Carl Lange, 89, German film actor.
Buster Merryfield, 78, British television actor, brain cancer.
Pierre Perrault, 71, Canadian documentary film director.
Bill Puddy, 82, Canadian swimmer and Olympian.
Grels Teir, 83, Finnish lawyer and politician.

24
Jim Allen, 72, English playwright.
Takehiko Bessho, 76, Japanese baseball player.
Hugh Carter, 78, American politician and businessman.
Geoff Lawson, 54, British car designer, stroke.
Dorothy Lee, 88, American actress and comedian, respiratory failure.
Jack Mullin, 85, American sound engineer.
Joe Redington, 82,  American dog musher and co-founder of the Iditarod Trail Sled Dog Race, cancer.
Seán Thomas, 98, Irish football manager.

25
Peter Abeles, 75, Austrian-Australian businessman.
Rawilja Agletdinowa, 39, Soviet middle-distance runner, traffic collision.
Charlie English, 89, American Major League Baseball player.
Fred Feast, 69, British television actor, cancer.
Tommy Ivan, 88, Canadian ice hockey coach and general manager, complications of a kidney ailment.
Yevgeny Morgunov, 72, Soviet and Russian actor, film director, and script writer, stroke.
Kōzō Murashita, 46, Japanese singer-songwriter, brain hemorrhage.
Oliver Ocasek, 73, American politician, liver cancer, colorectal cancer.
Jorge Góngora Ojeda, 92, Peruvian football player.
Lars Svensson, 72, Swedish ice hockey goaltender and Olympic medalist.
Frank Tarloff, 83, American screenwriter who was blacklisted, cancer.
Fred Trump, 93, American real estate developer and father of Donald Trump, pneumonia.

26
Angelo Bertelli, 78, American gridiron football player, brain cancer.
Charles Collins, 95, American singer and actor, pneumonia.
Muza Krepkogorskaya, 74, Soviet and Russian theater and film actress.
Tim Layana, 35, American baseball player, car accident.
Jiří Pelikán, 76, Czechoslovakian journalist and politician, cancer.
John R. Philip, 72, Australian physicist and hydrologist.
Bobs Watson, 68, American actor and methodist minister, prostate cancer.

27
Fernando Alvarez, 61, American thoroughbred horse racing jockey and trainer.
Harriet P. Dustan, American physician.
Einar Englund, 83, Finnish composer.
Kōji Horaguchi, 45, Japanese rugby player, traffic collision.
Wilhelm Höttl, 84, Austrian Nazi and holocaust perpetrator during World War II.
Isaac C. Kidd, Jr., 79, American admiral, cancer.
John Langridge, 89, English cricket player.
Siegfried Lowitz, 84, German actor.
Marion Motley, 79, American football player (Cleveland Browns), prostate cancer.
George Papadopoulos, 80, Greek politician, Prime Minister (1967–1973) and dictator, cancer.
Truus van Aalten, 88, Dutch actress.
Alfred Robens, Baron Robens of Woldingham, 88, English trade unionist, politician and industrialist.

28
Vere Bird, 88, first Prime Minister of Antigua and Barbuda.
Louis Ducatel, 97, French politician and businessman.
Hilde Krahl, 82, Austrian film actress.
Eugenio Lopez, Jr., 70, Filipino businessman, cancer.
Sir John Woolf, 86, British film producer.
Anatoliy Zheglanov, 56, Soviet and Ukrainian ski-jumper and Olympian.

29
Allan Carr, 62, American film, television and theatre producer (La Cage aux Folles), liver cancer.
Michael Hooker, 53, American academic, complications of non-Hodgkin's lymphoma.
Karekin I, 66, Syrian Catholicos of the Armenian Apostolic Church, cancer.
Declan Mulholland, 66, Northern Irish actor, heart attack.
Constance Shacklock, 86, English contralto.
Bert Shefter, 97, Russian-American film composer.

30
Bob Backus, 72, American track and field athlete and hammer throw world record holder.
Édouard Boubat, 75, French photojournalist and art photographer, leukemia.
Clifford Charles Butler, 77, English physicist,.
Dean Fredericks, 75, American film and television actor, cancer.
Walter Johnson, 56, American gridiron football player.
Marta Labarr, 87, French-American singer and actress.
Beveridge Webster, 91, American pianist and educator.

References 

1999-06
 06